Mexico participated at the 2020 Summer Paralympics in Tokyo, Japan, from 24 August to 5 September 2021.

Medalists

Medals by date

Medals by sport

Competitors
The following is the list of number of competitors participating in the Games:

Archery 

Two athletes will be representing Mexico at the 2020 Summer Paralympics.

Athletics 

24 athletes will be representing Mexico at the 2020 Summer Paralympics.

DQ: Disqualified | SB: Season Best | Q: Qualified by place or standard based on overall position after heats | DNM: Did not mark | DNA: Did not advance | N/A: Not available, stage was not contested | PB: Personal Best | WR: World Record | PR: Paralympic Record | AR: Area Record

Men's track

Men's field

Women's track

Women's field

Boccia 

Mexico is scheduled to compete in Individual BC1 events.

Equestrian 

Mexico sent one athlete after qualification.

DNA: Did not advance

Judo 

Mexico sent two athletes in Judo. They are both current Paralympic champions.

Powerlifting 

Mexico sent four athletes in Powerlifting.

DNM: Did not mark

Rowing

Mexico qualified one boat in the men's single sculls events for the games by winning the silver medal at the 2021 FISA Americas Qualification Regatta in Rio de Janeiro, Brazil.

Qualification Legend: FA=Final A (medal); FB=Final B (non-medal); R=Repechage

Swimming 

Three Mexican swimmers are qualified to compete in swimming via the 2019 World Para Swimming Championships slot allocation method & 15 Mexican swimmers qualified by MQS.

DQ: Disqualified | Q: Qualified by time based on overall position after heats | DNS: Did not start | DNA: Did not advance | N/A: Not available, event went straight to final

Men

Women

Table tennis

Mexico entered three athletes into the table tennis competition at the games. All of the qualified from the 2019 Parapan American Games which was held in Lima, Peru.

Men

Women

Taekwondo

Mexico qualified three athletes to compete at the Paralympics competition. Francisco Pedroza and Daniela Andrea Martínez Mariscal qualified by winning the gold medal at the 2020 Americas Qualification Tournament in San Jose, Costa Rica. Meanwhile, the other athlete, Juan Diego García López qualified by finishing second in world ranking men's –75 kg category K44.

DNA: Did not advance | PTF: Win by final score | RSC: Referee stops combat

Triathlon

Mexico qualified a female athlete to compete at the Paralympics competition.

See also 
 Mexico at the Paralympics
 Mexico at the 2020 Summer Olympics

References 

Nations at the 2020 Summer Paralympics
2020
Summer Paralympics